You Would Have Loved This is Tarja's second solo single which is a dedication to her mother and predates the release of her Christmas album, Henkäys Ikuisuudesta. Five fans watched the single being made after winning the promotion, "Win a Day With Tarja Turunen", made in the official web forum. The single was released with only 1,000 copies, that were sold out in the first selling week, taking the 5th place in the official Finnish parades, the highest position for a new music in the first week.

"You Would Have Loved This" was recorded originally by Cori Connors to the album "Sleepy Little Town". The music was written for Connors' mother-in-law, Helen Roy Connors, who died in 1994. Tarja saw similarities with the lyrics, and decided to put on the album:

Track listing 
 "You Would Have Loved This" (Radio version)
 "Walking In The Air" (Classical version)
 "You Would Have Loved This" (Single Version)

Personnel
Tarja Turunen - Lead vocals
Esa Nieminen - Piano

References

External links
 Cori Connors explains the story behind the song on her personal blog

2006 singles
Tarja Turunen songs
2006 songs
Universal Music Group singles